In Person at El Matador is a 1965 live-album by Sérgio Mendes and Brasil '65. It was recorded at El Matador in San Francisco, California

Track listing
 "Reza" (Edu Lobo & Ruy Guerra)
 "O Morro (Feio não é bonito)" (Carlos Lyra, Gianfrancesco Guarnieri)
 "Samba do Astronauta" (Baden Powell, Vinícius de Moraes)
 "Tem Dó de mim" (Carlos Lyra)
 "Jodel" (João Donato)
 "Samba de José" (José Menezes)
 "Nôa Nôa" (Sérgio Mendes)
 "Black Orpheus Medley: Manhã de Carnaval/Batuque de Orfeu/Samba de Orfeu/A Felicidade" (Luiz Bonfá, Antônio Maria/Rossini Pacheco/Luiz Bonfá, Antônio Maria/Antônio Carlos Jobim, Vinícius de Moraes)
 "Arrastão" (Edu Lobo, Vinícius de Moraes)
 "Vai de Vez" (Roberto Menescal, Luiz Fernando Freire)
 "Caminho de Casa" (João Donato)

Album credits

Performance credits
Sérgio Mendes –  Piano, Vocals
Wanda de Sah – Vocals
Sebastião Neto – Bass
Chico Batera – Drums
Paulinho Magalhães – Percussion
Rosinha de Valença – Solo Guitar (Tracks 3, 6 & 10)

Technical credits
Wally Heider – Recording Engineer

Sérgio Mendes albums
1965 live albums
Atlantic Records live albums
Albums produced by Nesuhi Ertegun